Golgi reassembly-stacking protein of 55 kDa (GRASP55) also known as golgi reassembly-stacking protein 2 (GORASP2) is a protein that in humans is encoded by the GORASP2 gene. It was identified by its homology with GRASP65 and the protein's amino acid sequence was determined by analysis of a molecular clone of its complementary DNA. The first (N-terminus) 212 amino acid residues of GRASP55 are highly homologous to those of GRASP65, but the remainder of the 454 amino acid residues are highly diverged from GRASP65. The conserved region is known as the GRASP domain, and it is conserved among GRASPs of a wide variety of eukaryotes, but not plants. The C-terminus portion of the molecule is called the SPR domain (serine, proline-rich). GRASP55 is more closely related to homologues in other species, suggesting that GRASP55 is ancestral to GRASP65. GRASP55 is found associated with the medial and trans cisternae of the Golgi apparatus.

Function 

GRASP55 is involved in establishing the structure of the Golgi apparatus. It is a peripheral membrane protein located on the Golgi cisterna, and it can bind to another GRASP55 located on an adjacent cisterna through the GRASP domain, thus linking the cisternae together through multiple protein–protein interactions.

GRASP55 is attached to the membrane in two ways; it is myristylated, which attaches it directly to the lipid bilayer; it is also bound indirectly by binding to golgin-45, which binds to a Rab protein, which itself is lipidated and thus anchored to the membrane.

The structure of the Golgi is disrupted during mitosis, and phosphorylation of the SPR domains of GRASP55 and GRASP65 regulate that disruption,
GRASP55 may also be involved in forming Golgi ribbons, but the evidence is mixed.

Other interactions 

GRASP55 has been shown to interact with TGF alpha, TMED2 and GOLGA2.

References

Further reading